Felipe Alejandro Núñez Becerra (born 25 February 1979) is a Venezuelan–born Chilean former professional football goalkeeper and journalist well known for his spell at Palestino and current manager of Deportes Recoleta.

In the mid 2010s, he completed a Bachelor of Arts in journalism at the University of the Americas.

Early life
Núñez was born in Caracas, Venezuela, to Chilean parents. During his stay at Caribbean country he played tournaments for his school team under the coaching of Lino Alonso, historic football-man in the Venezuelan football history. He lived there until 1991 when he moved to his homeland and settled in his grandfather’s house at Santiago commune of Estación Central after his parents divorce.

Club career
He started his career at Colo-Colo youth set-up aged fifteen. After the club’s bankruptcy he left the club and joined second-tier side Arturo Fernandez Vial in 2000. In Concepción–based side, Núñez was first-choice keeper, playing 32 games during his spell and even scoring one goal, after netting a free kick score in a 4–1 home win over Unión San Felipe.

In mid-2002, he went to Mexico along Sebastián González who completed his move to top-level team Atlante. However Chamagol recommended him to play at the club’s filial Potros Neza, which Núñez successfully joined.

In 2004 Núñez returned to his country and joined Palestino. He was an undisputed started and captain during his ten-year spell in the Arab Palestininian community club. There he reached the 2008 Torneo Clausura runner-up (where was red carded in the first leg final) and was included in the league’s team of the tournament by football magazine El Gráfico. On 5 September 2014, he resigned from Palestino after differences with the coach Pablo Guede.

On 22 January 2015, Núñez signed for Huachipato, after reaching a 18-month contract.

International career
Núñez was second-choice for the Chilean under-20 team that played the 1999 South American U-20 Championship and the under-23 team that reached the 2000 Summer Olympics. Previously, along with Chile U20, he won the L'Alcúdia Tournament in 1998.

In 2012, he received an offer from the Venezuelan Football Federation to play for its national team, but this however didn’t thrived.

Managerial career
In 2019, he worked as the assistant coach of Francisco Arrué in Chilean Segunda División side Colchagua. In 2020, he became the manager of Deportes Recoleta in the same division.

Honours
Chile U20
 L'Alcúdia International Tournament (1): 1998

See also
List of goalscoring goalkeepers

References

External links
 Felipe Núñez at Football Lineups 
 
 

1979 births
Living people
People from Caracas
Footballers from Caracas
Citizens of Chile through descent
Naturalized citizens of Chile
Association football goalkeepers
Chilean footballers
Chilean journalists
University of the Americas (Chile) alumni
Chile youth international footballers
Chile under-20 international footballers
Chilean expatriate footballers
Chilean Primera División players
Primera B de Chile players
Liga Premier de México players
Venezuelan Primera División players
C.D. Arturo Fernández Vial footballers
Toros Neza footballers
Club Deportivo Palestino footballers
C.D. Huachipato footballers
Deportivo La Guaira players
Santiago Wanderers footballers
Chilean expatriate sportspeople in Mexico
Expatriate footballers in Mexico
Chilean expatriate sportspeople in Venezuela
Expatriate footballers in Venezuela
Deportes Recoleta managers
Chilean football managers